Jailbreak is the sixth studio album by Irish hard rock band Thin Lizzy. It was released on 26 March 1976, by Vertigo Records. The album proved to be the band's commercial breakthrough in the US, and the only Thin Lizzy album with a certification (in this case, Gold) in that country. The singles taken from the album include "Jailbreak" and "The Boys Are Back in Town"; the latter is Thin Lizzy's biggest US hit, and won the 1976 NME Award for Best Single.

Composition and recording 
After their previous two albums, Nightlife and Fighting, failed to generate sales, Thin Lizzy were given one last chance by their label, Vertigo Records. The band wrote songs and collected ideas in a studio in Buckinghamshire in late 1975, then convened at Ramport Studios in London in the new year. They selected John Alcock as their producer, for he had worked in the studio extensively. The band worked diligently through February on the album. However, guitarists Scott Gorham and Brian Robertson felt that the speed at which it was completed adversely affected its quality. Both stated that the tightness of the songs made the album feel rigid. In particular, Robertson said he would have liked more freedom to improvise his lead guitar parts. Gorham also criticized Alcock's production, saying that he didn't particularly care for his guitar tone on the album.

"When I wrote 'Warriors'…" frontman and songwriter Phil Lynott remarked in 1976, "the only way I could give any sense of heavy drug takers was by describing them as warriors; that they actually go out and do it. People like Hendrix and Duane Allman were perfectly aware of the position they were getting into. They weren't slowly being hooked. It was a conscious decision to go out and take the thing as far as it can go."

Initially, the song "Running Back" was chosen to be a single ahead of "The Boys Are Back in Town", the latter being seen as possibly too aggressive for some radio stations to play. Lynott and producer John Alcock decided to employ session musicians to add more commercial elements to some of the tracks and try to produce a hit single, so Tim Hinkley was brought in to add keyboard parts to "Running Back". Robertson was against the idea, as he liked the song as it had originally been arranged, in a blues format with his own additions of piano and bottleneck guitar. He later said, "I took enormous offence to [the changes]. I couldn't understand why they'd pay this guy a fortune just for playing what he did. Listen to it and tell me it's not bollocks." Robertson did not play on the finished version of the song and Hinkley is not credited on the album sleeve. Lynott said at the time that "Running Back" was "very much influenced by Van Morrison. I really like that song." Hinkley later recalled, "Robbo and Scott were not keen on it at all but they were overruled." Thirty-five years later, Robertson recorded his own versions of the song on his 2011 album Diamonds and Dirt.

Scott Gorham also revealed that "Romeo and the Lonely Girl" was also brought up as an option for a single, but was ultimately discarded, as "nobody was overexcited about it."

Tour
While touring to promote the album, in the US, Lynott was stricken with hepatitis. Finally, the tour management decided to cancel the remaining tour dates allowing him time to recuperate.

Reception

Village Voice critic Robert Christgau likened the album's songs to Bruce Springsteen cast-offs, finding Lynott's lyrical ideas "boring" and Gorham's guitar lines "second-hand". Stuart Bailie of Classic Rock magazine referred back to Christgau's appraisal, writing that both Springsteen and Lynott "were indebted to Van Morrison and his Celtic soul", and remarked how on Jailbreak "Lynott's best attributes were coming on strong."

In a retrospective assessment for AllMusic, Stephen Thomas Erlewine describes Jailbreak as a "truly exceptional album", with "a dimension of richness that sustains, but there's such kinetic energy to the band that it still sounds immediate no matter how many times it's played". Highlighting Lynott's songs as "lovingly florid... crammed with specifics and overflowing with life", he says that Gorham and Robertson's guitar work is "intertwined, dual-lead guitar interplay that was one of the most distinctive sounds of '70s rock". In his review Martin Popoff described Jailbreak as "the band's last album where eclecticism outweighs the cohesive signals" which made later releases "much more singular in intent". He praised "Gorham and Robertson's sharpest metal to date" and remarked how the album is made of "a coterie of songs that very often struck the same emotional heartstrings of Springsteen."

Track listings

On the 1996 Mercury CD reissue, "Angel from the Coast" and "Running Back" are listed as the second track with only one running time, making it appear to be a single song called "Angel from the Coast Running Back", and there is no third track listed. However, all the songs are sequenced as on the original LP release.

Remastered edition
On 24 January 2011, a new remastered and expanded version of Jailbreak was released. This new edition is a 2-CD set, with the original album on disc one, and bonus material on disc two. On the original vinyl release of the album, the back cover included a short story, which is also reprinted inside some editions of the new deluxe edition.

However, the track listing on the back cover of the first release was incorrect, listing only ten songs, while the actual CD contains eleven tracks. Also, the songs are not in the correct order. The track listing was corrected on later versions of the release.

Only the bonus material on disc two has been remastered in 2010 (despite what it says on the back of the CD booklet). Disc one uses the same remaster as the 1996 edition. New remasters were made, but scrapped at the last minute before the release, for reasons unknown.

Singles
"The Boys are Back in Town" / "Emerald" – 17 April 1976
Some countries, including the US and Canada, featured "Jailbreak" as the B-side.
"Jailbreak" / "Running Back" – 30 July 1976
"Cowboy Song" / "Angel from the Coast" (Canada and US only)

Personnel
Thin Lizzy
Phil Lynott – bass guitar, lead vocals, acoustic guitar
Scott Gorham – lead and rhythm guitars
Brian Robertson – lead and rhythm guitars
Brian Downey – drums, percussion

Additional musicians
Tim Hinkley – keyboards on "Running Back" (uncredited)

Production
John Alcock – producer
Will Reid Dick – engineer
Neil Hornby – assistant engineer

Charts

Album

Weekly charts

Year-end charts

Singles

The Boys Are Back in Town

Jailbreak

Cowboy Song

Certifications

References

Thin Lizzy albums
1976 albums
Mercury Records albums
Vertigo Records albums